McFarland is an extinct town in Taney County, in the U.S. state of Missouri. The community was on Swan Creek approximately two miles north of Forsyth.

A post office called McFarland was established in 1901, and remained in operation until 1911. The community has the name of one Mr. McFarland, the original owner of the town site.

References

Ghost towns in Missouri
Former populated places in Taney County, Missouri